Bakanas (Baqanas) is a village in Kazakhstan, the regional center of Balkhash district of Almaty region. The administrative center of the Bakanas rural district. The Bakanas is the final pier on the banks of the Ili river. To the North of Bakanas began the ancient delta of the Ili - Bakanas river of the same name. Now it is the territory of the Saryesik - Atyrau desert. At the village begins the world's northernmost massif - Akdalinsk, laid out in the 1970s.

The Bakanas canal irrigates rice fields. 
The Bakanas village is a popular destination for fishermen, hunters, and archaeologists who study the ancient settlements of the Ili Delta — Aktam and Karamergen.
The Bakanas has a branch of the Institute of botany and Phytointroduction, a Botanical garden.

Museum 
The local history museum opened based on the decision of the Akim of Almaty region in 2003. The museum's collection contains 1,804 items of significance. The museum exhibits materials of heroes of labor and war, personal belongings of D.A. Kunaev, items of flora and fauna and the history of the district.

Source and links 
1. Bakanas

References

Populated places in Almaty Region